On with the Show is the second studio album by Australian band, Sherbet released in November 1973. The album spent 12 weeks in the Australian charts, peaking at number #6. "Cassandra" was the only single to be released.

Track listing

Personnel
Alto saxophone – Ken Schroader (tracks: 5)
Bass, vocals – Tony Mitchell
Congas – Gary Hyde (tracks: 6)
Drums – Alan Sandow
Electric guitar, acoustic guitar, slide guitar, vocals – Clive Shakespeare
Lead vocals – Daryl Braithwaite
Organ, piano, mellotron, harpsichord, vocals – Garth Porter

Charts

Certifications

Release history

References

Sherbet (band) albums
1973 albums
Festival Records albums
Infinity Records albums